The Roman Catholic Diocese of Bom Jesus do Gurguéia  is a Latin suffragan diocese  in the Ecclesiastical province of the Metropolitan Archbishop of Teresina, in northeastern Brazil's Piauí state.

Its cathedral episcopal see is the Marian Catedral de Nossa Senhora das Mercês, located in the city of Bom Jesus, Piauí.

History 
 Established on 18 June 1920 as Territorial Prelature of Bom Jesus do Piauí, on territory split off from the Diocese of Piaui
 Lost territory on 17 December 1960 to establish the then Territorial Prelature of São Raimundo Nonato (later promoted to diocese)
 Promoted on 3 October 1981 as Diocese of Bom Jesus do Gurguéia

Bishops
(all Roman Rite)

Ordinaries
Territorial (bishop-)prelates of Bom Jesus do Piauí  
 Pedro Pascual Miguel y Martínez, Order of the Blessed Virgin Mary of Mercy (Mercederians, O. de M.) (18 December 1924 – death 5 May 1926), titular bishop of Agathopolis (18 December 1924 – 5 May 1926)
 Ramón Harrison Abello, O. de M. (14 November 1926 – retired 1928), titular bishop of Podalia (14 November 1926 – death 9 August 1949)
 Inocéncio Lopez Santamaria, O. de M. (1 August 1930 – death 9 March 1958), titular bishop of Trebenna (1 August 1930 – 9 March 1958)
 José Vázquez Díaz, O. de M. (8 March 1958 – 3 October 1981 see below), succeeded as former coadjutor bishop-prelate of Bom Jesus do Piauí (8 July 1956 – 8 March 1958) and titular bishop of Usula (8 July 1956 – 26 May 1978) Auxiliary bishop Abel Alonso Núñez, O. de M. (14 July 1971 – 24 March 1976), titular bishop of Nicives (14 July 1971 – 24 March 1976); later Bishop of Campo Maior (Brazil) (24 March 1976 – retired 2 February 2000)

Suffragan bishops of Bom Jesus do Gurguéia
 José Vázquez Díaz, O. de M. (see above 3 October 1981 – retired 1 March 1989)
 Ramón López Carrozas, O. de M. (1 March 1989 – retired 15 January 2014), succeeded as former auxiliary bishop of Bom Jesus do Gurguéia (26 April 1979 – 1 March 1989) and titular bishop of Ceramus (26 April 1979 – 1 March 1989)
 Marcos Antônio Tavoni (15 January 2014 – )

Coadjutor prelate
José Vázquez Díaz, O. de M. (1956-1958)

Auxiliary bishops
Abel Alonso Núñez, O. de M. † (1971-1976), appointed Bishop of Campo Maior, Piaui
Ramón López Carrozas, O. de M. (1979-1989), appointed bishop here

Sources and external links
 GCatholic.org, with incumbent bio links
 Catholic Hierarchy

Roman Catholic dioceses in Brazil
Christian organizations established in 1920
Roman Catholic Ecclesiastical Province of Teresina
Roman Catholic dioceses and prelatures established in the 20th century